Marumi Shiraishi (白石 マル美, formerly 白石 まるみ) (born November 27, 1962) is an actress and media personality from Tokyo, Japan. Her real name is Mitsue Minamikawa (南川 光江) and her maiden name was Matsuda (松田).

In 1978, Shiraishi auditioned for the part of leading man Hiromi Go's sweetheart on the TBS TV drama, Mū ichozoku and debuted as the girl in "Izakaya Hiromi."

Not limited only to television, Shiraishi was a multifaceted idol active also as a singer, movie actress, and radio personality.

Later, in 2002, she changed the spelling of her stage name from "まるみ" to the identically pronounced "マル美" and has been hosting a TV shopping program, living frugally on Ikinari! Ōgon densetsu, and appearing as a TV travelogue reporter.

As a hobby, she plays in a badminton club and is said to be very good.

Appearances
 Taiyō ni Hoero! (TV) guest appearance
 Kotoshi no botan wa yoi botan (1983) (TV)
 Stewardess monogatari (1983) (TV)
 Getsuyō drama land (TV)
 Kaseifu ha mita! (1990-2004) (TV)
 Family (2001)
 Bright Future (2003)
 Morning Salad (TV variety show)

External links
 Marumi Shiraishi's official home page (Japanese, created by Marumi herself)
 

1962 births
Living people
Japanese actresses